Dundalk entered the 1932–33 season on the back of a fourth-place finish in the League and a fifth-place finish in the Shield the previous season. 1932–33 was manager Steve Wright's third season at the club, and was Dundalk's 7th consecutive season in the top tier of Irish football. Home matches were played at the Dundalk Athletic Grounds (a facility near the town centre shared by several sporting codes).

Season summary
After Dundalk had finished as runners-up in both league and FAI Cup in 1930–31, the club's management committee had invested heavily in the side for the following season. The club had also been converted to a membership-based limited company – "Dundalk A.F.C. Limited" – on 25 January 1932. They won their first trophy as a senior club in 1931, the LFA President's Cup, and had looked like landing the league title, until an end of season slump saw them slip to fourth place. That, and a first round FAI Cup exit, had contributed to a poor financial position by the end of the 1931–32 season, and the team had been broken up. There was little expectation of success for 1932–33.

The 1932–33 season would be the last in which the league programme was played before the Shield. As the number of teams in the League had been reduced to ten, both league and Shield competitions were played on an 18-match, double round-robin basis. The league schedule got under way on 21 August 1932, and Dundalk were top after three matches. They opened up a three-point lead after the fifth match, in large part due to a solid defence that had conceded only two goals to that point. They continued to lead from the front and, despite dropping three points with the title in sight, they won it with a game to spare by defeating Bohemians in Dalymount Park. Their final match at home to St James's Gate the following week was delayed while the Gate players lined up to congratulate Dundalk captain, Gerry McCourt, in front of a cheering crowd. In becoming Champions, Dundalk were the first team from outside Dublin or Belfast to win a league title in Ireland since the inception of the Irish League in 1890. The season also saw their first league victories over Shelbourne and Bohemians – Dublin's two original Irish League clubs. Shelbourne got a measure of revenge, however, by defeating Dundalk in a second round replay in the Leinster Senior Cup.

Christmas and New Year saw a defeat in the opening Shield match and an exit in the first round of the FAI Cup to Dolphin after a replay. They got back in their stride, however, to reel off seven straight wins, and were still top of the Shield table after 12 matches. Their Shield challenge blew up subsequently, with three straight defeats. They won their final three matches, but it was not enough, and they finished two points behind Shamrock Rovers – points dropped to the bottom two sides (Bray Unknowns and Cork Bohemians) ultimately costing them. Having just missed out on a League and Shield Double, Dundalk would not win the league again until 1962–63, while they would not win the Shield until 1966–67.

First-Team Squad (1932–33)
Sources:

Competitions

Leinster Senior Cup
Source:
First Round

Second Round

Second Round Replay

League
Source:

League table

FAI Cup
Source:
First Round

First Round Replay

Shield
Source:

Shield table

References
Bibliography

Citations

Dundalk
Dundalk F.C. seasons